John Cather (1814–1888) was an Irish Anglican priest and teacher.

Cather was born in Tyrone, educated at Trinity College, Dublin.  He was Rector of Crossboyne then Westport. Cather held the office of Archdeacon of Tuam from 1855 until his death on 15 May 1888.

Notes

1814 births
1888 deaths
Irish Anglicans
Archdeacons of Tuam
Alumni of Trinity College Dublin